"Lose Your Love" is a song by English synth-pop duo Blancmange, released in October 1985 as the second single from their third studio album Believe You Me (1985). It was written by Neil Arthur and Stephen Luscombe, and produced by Stewart Levine. "Lose Your Love" reached No. 77 in the UK, which was the duo's first single to fail to reach the Top 40 since 1982's "Feel Me". In the United States, it was a dance hit, reaching No. 2 on the Billboard Dance/Club Play Songs Chart.

Release
For its release as a single, "Lose Your Love" was remixed. The B-side, "John", also appeared on Believe You Me (1985). The single was released in the UK, Canada, Japan and Europe by London Records, while it was released in America through Sire Records. In the UK only, a special double 7" vinyl gatefold release was issued. The bonus 7" vinyl featured an extended remix of the duo's 1983 hit single "That's Love, That It Is" and "Game Above My Head (Extended Remix)".

For 12" editions of the single, an extended version of "Lose Your Love" was created, along with "Mixing on the Ceiling", a 10 minute medley of various Blancmange songs. In the US, the 12" vinyl release featured the extended version of "Lose Your Love", while the B-side was an extended version of the West India Company track "Ave Maria", featuring Vince Clarke as guest musician on pyrotechnics. "Ave Maria (Om Ganesha)" was originally released as West India Company's debut single in 1984.

Music video
The song's music video was directed by Zbigniew Rybczyński. On its release, it was banned by both UK broadcasting companies BBC and ITV due to violence. In the US, it achieved light rotation on MTV. The music video appeared in the 1986 Disney sci-fi film Flight of the Navigator.

In a 2011 interview, Arthur recalled the video: "We had great fun making the video for that, many years ago. We flew over to New York to film it. The video got banned by ITV and the BBC for 'inciting violence in the home'. Because we were smashing up things. It was ridiculous. We hired an old, abandoned terminal in Manhattan – each room was a different scenario. And then we went upstate and pulled a house down for the finale! An old house was going to be demolished and we filmed it being pulled down."

Critical reception
Upon release, Billboard picked the single as a recommended pop single and wrote: "Seminal British synthpop duo unevils one of its infrequent singles, sounding a good deal mellower and more relaxed than in its "Living on the Ceiling" days." Billboard also commented on the 12-inch remix of "Lose Your Love", commenting: "The epic-length remix of "Lose Your Love" suggests that a new, artier form of high-energy may be emerging..." Dave Ling of Number One said: ""Lose Your Love" is an emphatic addition to their list of triumphs, boasting an odd two-fingered twiddly keyboard arrangement and a chorus of truly immense proportions. Miss it at your peril."

In a review of the 2017 deluxe edition of Believe You Me (1985), Paul Scott-Bates of Louder Than War described the song as an "immediate singalong track with a wall of sound and a toe-tapping chorus that is difficult to shake". The Electricity Club commented the song was "certainly one of the more punchy moments on the album".

Track listing
7" single
 "Lose Your Love" – 3:58
 "John" – 4:12

7" single (US promo)
 "Lose Your Love (Edit)" – 3:59
 "Lose Your Love (LP Version)" – 3:56

2x 7" single (UK gatefold release)
 "Lose Your Love" – 4:07
 "John" – 4:17
 "That's Love, That It Is" – 7:30
 "Game Above My Head (Extended Remix) " – 7:06

12" single (UK release)
 "Lose Your Love (Extended Version)" – 10:12
 "John" – 4:17
 "Mixing on the Ceiling" – 10:38

12" single (UK promo)
 "Lose Your Love (Extended Version)" – 10:11
 "John" – 4:17
 "Mixing on the Ceiling" – 10:39

12" single (US release)
 "Lose Your Love (Extended Version)" – 10:05
 "Ave Maria (Extended Version)" (West India Company) – 7:30

12" single (French release)
 "(No, No, No) Lose Your Love (Extended Version)" – 10:12
 "John" – 4:12
 "Mixing on the Ceiling (Megamix)" – 10:35

12" single (German release)
 "Lose Your Love (Extended Version)" – 10:12
 "Mixing on the Ceiling" – 10:35

12" single (Canadian promo #1)
 "Lose Your Love" – 3:58
 "Lose Your Love" – 3:58

12" single (Canadian promo #2)
 "Lose Your Love (This Club Mix)" – 6:45
 "Lose Your Love" – 3:58

Personnel
Blancmange
 Neil Arthur – lead vocals
 Stephen Luscombe – keyboards, synthesizers, producer of "John"

Additional personnel
 David Rhodes – guitar
 Katie Kissoon, Stevie Lange – backing vocals
 Justin Hildreth – drums
 Stewart Levine – producer of "Lose Your Love"
 John Luongo – mixer, editor, remixer

Charts

References

External links

1985 songs
1985 singles
Blancmange (band) songs
London Records singles
Sire Records singles
Songs written by Neil Arthur
Songs written by Stephen Luscombe
Song recordings produced by Stewart Levine
Music videos directed by Zbigniew Rybczyński